AV-Comparatives is an Austrian independent organization that tests and assesses antivirus software, regularly releasing charts and reports that are freely available to the public and the media. Antivirus vendors have to meet various requirements regarding trustworthiness and reliability in order to take part in the tests.

AV-Comparatives issues relevant awards, based on antivirus software's comprehensive performance according to multiple testing criteria. It is also supported by the University of Innsbruck and other academic bodies from around the world, as well as by the Austrian Federal Government and the regional government of Tirol.

Real World Protection Test
The AV-Comparatives "Real World Protection Test" is a test environment that closely approximates how well an antivirus product will protect real-world users. Test results are released monthly (from March to June and August to November). Two detailed overall result reports are released in June and December. The Real World Protection Test framework was recognized by the "Standortagentur Tirol" with the 2012 Cluster Award for innovation in computer science.

Latest Test Series 
In 2018 AV-Comparatives started with a large scale Enterprise Security Software Test Series, consisting of a Real-World Test, a False Alarm Test, a Malware Protection Test and a Performance Test as well as a review.

Listing of tests and reviews by AV-Comparatives
 Real-World Protection Tests
 File Detection Tests
 Malware Protection Test
 Heuristic / Behaviour Test
 False Alarm Test
 PerformanceTest
 Malware Removal Test
 Anti-Phishing Test
 Parental Control Test
 Mac Security Reviews / Tests
 Mobile Security Review
 Corporate / Enterprise Security Reviews
 PowerShell-based File-less Attacks and File-based Exploits Test

Operating systems used for antivirus tests
 Microsoft Windows
 macOS
 iOS
 Android
 Linux

AVC UnDroid Analyzer
AV-Comparatives has provided "UnDroid APK Analyzer" as a free service for its website's users since May 2013. Designed for Android smartphone users, it provides a static analysis of Android apps. Users can upload an Android application package (APK) and receive a quick online analysis containing the file hashes, graphical danger level and additional information.

Awards and certifications given to AV-Comparatives
 2016: EN ISO 9001:2015 for the Scope "Independent Tests of Anti-Virus Software"
 2015: EICAR trusted IT-security testing lab
 2013: Constantinus Award in Computer Science, the highest award/certification given by Austrian Government (Chamber of Commerce) for projects in computer science.
 2012: Austrian eAward
 2012: Cluster Award 2012

References list

External links
 
 Constantinus
 University of Innsbruck, Quality Engineering (Laura Bassi Centre)
 University of Innsbruck, Databases and Information Systems (DBIS)
 Standort Agentur Tirol

Antivirus software
Non-profit organisations based in Austria
Organisations based in Innsbruck